Ajam of Kuwait or Ayam of Kuwait are Kuwaiti citizens of Iranian origin. Historically, Persian ports provided most of pre-oil Kuwait's economic needs. Marafi Behbahani was one of the first merchants to settle in Kuwait in the 18th century. 

The majority of Shia Kuwaiti citizens are of Iranian ancestry. Some Kuwaitis of Iranian origin are Sunni  Muslims such as the Al-Kandari and Al-Awadhi families of Larestani ancestry. Iranian Balochi families first immigrated to Kuwait in the 19th century. Some Kuwaitis of Iranian Balochi origin are Sunni. Although historically the term Ajam included both Sunni and Shia in Kuwait, nowadays in modern-day Kuwait, the term Ajam almost exclusively refers to Shia only; which is partly due to political sensitivities following the 1979 Iranian Revolution.

The Ajam of Kuwait originate from different Iranian ethnic groups including Lurs, Persian, Azerbaijani, and Kurdish. The majority of Ajam originate from Lamerd in Fars Province. There are also Kuwaiti Ajam of Sayyid origin especially those from the Al-Musawi family.

History

Antiquity
In 127 BC, Kuwait was part of the Parthian Empire and the kingdom of Characene was established around Teredon in present-day Kuwait. Characene was centered in the region encompassing southern Mesopotamia, Characene coins were discovered in Akkaz, Umm an Namil, and Failaka. A busy Parthian commercial station was situated in Kuwait.

In 224 AD, Kuwait became part of the Sassanid Empire. At the time of the Sassanid Empire, Kuwait was known as Meshan, which was an alternative name of the kingdom of Characene. Akkaz was a Partho-Sassanian site; the Sassanid religion's tower of silence was discovered in northern Akkaz. Late Sassanian settlements were discovered in Failaka. In Bubiyan, there is archaeological evidence of Sassanian to early Islamic periods of human presence as evidenced by the recent discovery of torpedo-jar pottery shards on several prominent beach ridges.

Pre-oil Kuwait City
Historically, Iranian ports provided most of pre-oil Kuwait's economic needs. Most Ajam (both Sunni and Shia) resided in the Sharq historical district in the old Kuwait City, thereby forming a linguistic enclave which preserved the language for generations until the discovery of oil. They communicated in Persian between each other, and did not frequently mingle with Arabic speakers who resided in other districts of Kuwait City until after the industrialisation of Kuwait City which scattered people who lived in the districts of Kuwait City to the suburbs. The linguistic enclave was not present any longer therefore the Ajam had to learn Kuwaiti Arabic to survive in the new environment.

In the pre-oil era, Ajam introduced many new things to Kuwait. For instance, the first hotel in Kuwait in the later years of pre-oil era was built by Yusuf Behbehani; the first telephone in Kuwait was brought by M. Ma’arafie; the first radio agency in Kuwait was established by M. Ma’arafie in 1935; and the first refrigerator in Kuwait was imported by M. Ma’arafie in 1934. Murad Behbehani was the first person to officially introduce television to Kuwait. He was the founder of Kuwait Television (KTV) before the company was nationalized by the government.

Failaka Island
The majority of Kuwaitis from Failaka Island are of Iranian ancestry. They originally migrated to Failaka from the Iranian coast, mainly Kharg Island and Bandar Lengeh. These people are commonly known as the Huwala in the GCC states. They are predominantly Sunni Muslims and speak Arabic fluently, although prior to the discovery of oil they also spoke Persian fluently. The most important Huwala settlement in Failaka Island pertained to 40 families who migrated from the Iranian island Kharg to Failaka in the years 1841-1842. The most recent settlement occurred in the early 1930s after the imposition of the unveiling law by Reza Shah. A minority of Failaka Island's Kuwaiti families are Shia Persians, they were noted as having their own hussainiyas and the older generations were frequent Arabic speakers, unlike the Kuwaiti Shia of Persian origin in mainland Kuwait City at the time.

Language

Historically, the Ajam of Kuwait spoke the Kuwaiti Persian language fluently. The Persian sub-dialects of Larestani, Khonji, Bastaki and Gerashi have influenced the vocabulary of Kuwaiti Arabic.

Discrimination
The anti-preservation attitude of the Kuwaiti government towards the Kuwaiti Persian language will eventually lead to the disappearance of the language in Kuwaiti society, as Abdulmuhsen Dashti projects. The government of Kuwait tries to delegitimise the use of the language in as many domains as possible.

The Persian language has been considered a significant threat to the dominant Sunni Arab society. In 2012, MP Muhammad Hassan al-Kandari called for a "firm legal action" against an advertisement for teaching the Persian language in Kuwait. The Kuwaiti television series Karimo received criticism for showing Kuwaiti actors speaking fluent Persian; with some racist voices claiming it was a dictated enforcement of "Iranian culture" on the Kuwaiti society.

The generation of young Kuwaiti Ajam born between 1983 and 1993 are reported to have a minimal proficiency in the language unlike the older generations of Kuwaiti Ajam. Many Ajam parents reported unwillingness to pass the language to young generations for pragmatic reasons, as it will hurdle integration into the xenophobic dominant culture. Kuwait is one of the most xenophobic countries in the world. The Ajam feel pressure to abandon ties that could be interpreted as showing belonging to other countries, in this case Iran, as Persian is synonymous with Iranian for a lot of Kuwaitis, and the Persian language is actually called Iranian in Kuwaiti Arabic. In several interviews conducted by PhD student Batoul Hasan, Ajam youth have shown hesitation to use or learn Persian due to stigmatisation and prejudice in Kuwait.

Notable people
Abdulhussain Abdulredha, actor
Abdulghaphor Hajjieh, economist and politician
Ahmad Ashkanani, bodybuilder
Ahmed Lari,  politician
Ali Hussain Al-Awadhi, journalist and politician 
Ali Al-Zinkawi, Olympics athlete
Ali Ashkanani, footballer
Abbas Qali, Olympics athlete
Adnan Zahid Abdulsamad, politician 
Ali al-Ihqaqi, Religious scholar 
Ali Abdulreda, footballer
Abdulwahed Al-Awadhi, politician
Abdullah Al-Buloushi, footballer
Abdulaziz Al-Buloushi, footballer
Kazem Behbehani, immunologist and retired professor, World Health Organization official 
Lara Dashti, Olympics athlete
Samir Said, footballer
Bashar al-Shatti, singer-songwriter of Star Academy fame
Sulaiman Qabazard, 1976 Olympics diver 
Emma Shah, singer
Yasser Al-Habib, religious cleric
Ibtihal Al-Khatib, secular academic
Mohammad Al-Mosawi, Olympics athlete
Mohammad Ashkanani, professional basketball player
Muhammad Baqir al-Muhri, an ayatollah
Mai Al Balushi, actress 
Shehab Kankoune, footballer
Saleh Ashour, politician
Sami Al-Lanqawi, footballer
Hassan Jawhar, politician
Hussain Al-Musawi, footballer 
Hamed Sadeq, sprinter 
Huda Ashkanani, poet
Rola Dashti, politician
Abbas Almohri, Religious scholar
Halema Boland, television host and entertainer 
Hamad al-Naqi, activist and blogger
Nasser Abul, online activist
Jenan Boushehri, politician 
Mohamed Jarragh, footballer
Zaid Ashkanani, racing driver

Further reading
 Rerouting the Persian Gulf: The Transnationalization of Iranian Migrant Networks, c.1900–1940
 The Shia Migration from Southwestern Iran to Kuwait: Push-Pull Factors during the Late Nineteenth and Early Twentieth Centuries
 Kuwait and Iran: Mutual Contact in the Pre-oil Era
 Between Modern and National Education: The ‘Ajam Schools of Bahrain and Kuwait
 Under the Sails: Maritime Conversations on Trade and Seafaring - Perspectives from Iran and Kuwait

References

Society of Kuwait
 
 
Ethnic groups in the Middle East
History of Kuwait
Iranian diaspora